CM College (officially: CM College of Arts and Science) is an unaided college in Nadavayal, Wayanad district under the CM Centre Madavoor affiliated to University of Calicut. It was established in 2010.

Departments 

 Commerce
 Computer Science
 English
 Management
 Mathematics
 Mass Communication
 Economics
 Physical Education

Notable alumni 

 Anagha Narikkuni, Politician
 Anoop Paul, Professor, Mary Matha Arts & Science College

See also

References

External links
CM College of Arts and Science
University of Calicut
University Grants Commission
National Assessment and Accreditation Council

Colleges affiliated with the University of Calicut
Arts and Science colleges in Kerala
Universities and colleges in Wayanad district
Educational institutions established in 2010
2010 establishments in Kerala